To Live and Die in Tsimshatsui is a 1994 Hong Kong crime film directed by Andrew Lau and starring Jacky Cheung, Tony Leung, Jacklyn Wu and Power Chan.

Plot
Crazy Lik and his friend Pong are two undercover cops who are sent to infiltrate triad leader Coffin Sing. Later as Sing is killed, the gang is split into two. Lik follows Hung Tai's side and Pong goes to the other. Lik becomes down as he is separated from his best friend and feeling responsible for Sing's death. This leads to a time where Lik gets drunk at his girlfriend Moon's mother's birthday party and making a fool of himself and Moon feels disgusted and leaves him. One time in a bar, Lik meets triad member Milky Fai, who helps Lik out to get good with Hung Tai and his sister Po. Milky Fai is actually a former undercover cop who has his own problems. Later on, Lik must decide whether or not to betray the triad brothers he has grown very close to completing the case for his superior whom he really hates and who is hitting on his girlfriend.

Cast
Jacky Cheung as Crazy Lik
Tony Leung Ka-fai as Milky Fai
Jacklyn Wu as Siu Po
Power Chan as Pong
Gigi Lai as Moon
Roy Cheung as Hung Tai
Shing Fui-On as Uncle On
Kwong Wah as Officer Suen
Hung Yan-yan as Bald rascal
Frankie Ng as Father Man
Bobby Yip as Man in brothel (uncredited)
Yuen Bun as SDU officer
Joan Tong as Fai's ex-wife
Parkman Wong as Coffin Sing
Sandra Ng as woman in movie (uncredited)
Mimi Chu as Moon's mother
Koo Ming-wah as Tai's thug
Chan Chi-fai as Brother Bau
William Chu as Milky Fai's son
Hung Siu-wan as triad girl
Yee Tin-hung as one of Man's goons
Sung Poon-chung as triad
Bowie Lau as Tai's thug
Tam Kon-chung as Tai's thug
Hau Woon-ling
Jacky Cheung Chun-hang as Tai's thug
John Cheung
Wong Chi-keung as cop
Gary Mak as cop
Lam Foo-wai as Bau's thug
Chun Kwai-bo as Bau's thug
So Wai-nam as Tai's thug
Lam Kwok-kit as Man's thug
Mei Yee
Wong Hoi-yiu as gambler
Simon Cheung as cop
Tenny Tsang as policeman

Box office
The film grossed HK$9,192,146 at the Hong Kong box office in its theatrical run from 13 August to 7 September 1994 in Hong Kong.

Award nomination
14th Hong Kong Film Awards
Nominated: Best Actor (Jacky Cheung)

See also
Jacky Cheung filmography
Wong Jing filmography

External links

To Live and Die in Tsimshatsui at Hong Kong Cinemagic

1994 films
1994 crime films
Hong Kong crime films
Triad films
Police detective films
1990s Cantonese-language films
Films directed by Andrew Lau
Films set in Hong Kong
Films shot in Hong Kong
1990s Hong Kong films